Méré is a commune in the Yvelines department in the Île-de-France region in north-central France. François Quesnay a Physiocrat and one of the first to attempt to establish a rational science of economics, was born in Méré.

See also
Communes of the Yvelines department

References

Communes of Yvelines